Guilherme Parede Pinheiro is a professional Brazilian football player who plays as a winger or forward for Vila Nova, on loan from Talleres.

References

External links

Living people
1995 births
Brazilian footballers
Brazilian expatriate footballers
Association football forwards
Association football wingers
Operário Ferroviário Esporte Clube players
J. Malucelli Futebol players
Ypiranga Futebol Clube players
Sport Club Internacional players
Coritiba Foot Ball Club players
Talleres de Córdoba footballers
CR Vasco da Gama players
Esporte Clube Juventude players
Argentine Primera División players
Brazilian expatriate sportspeople in Argentina
Expatriate footballers in Argentina
Sportspeople from Mato Grosso do Sul